"Stuck with You" is a song by American rock band Huey Lewis and the News, written by guitarist Chris Hayes and lead singer Huey Lewis. Released in 1986, it was the first single from the band's fourth album, Fore!. The song spent three weeks at number one on the US Billboard Hot 100, becoming the band's second number-one hit on the chart. Internationally, the song became the band's second top-20 hit in the United Kingdom, reaching number 12 on the UK Singles Chart, and peaked within the top 10 in Australia, Canada, Iceland, South Africa, and New Zealand.

Origin
According to Lewis, the song was written about a girl he liked; however, she didn't like the song once he revealed it to her.

Reception
Cash Box called it a "romantic pop song." Billboard said it has "a skewed love lyric set to street-corner harmonizing."

Music video
The music video for "Stuck with You" was filmed in the Bahamas in July 1986 and features Keely Shaye Smith. The island that Lewis and Smith wind up on is a small island about ten miles from Paradise Island in Nassau. The video was filmed on land, on water, underwater, and from the air. The band, the crew and all the extras used in the island barbecue scene had to stay on a barge moored off the island so that they wouldn't be seen.

The video was directed by Edd Griles, who had previously directed the band's videos for "The Heart of Rock & Roll" and "If This Is It", as well as Cyndi Lauper's "Girls Just Want to Have Fun" and "Time After Time".

Charts

Weekly charts

Year-end charts

Release history

See also
 List of Billboard Hot 100 number-one singles of 1986
 List of number-one adult contemporary singles of 1986 (U.S.)
 List of number-one singles of 1986 (Canada)

References

External links
 

Huey Lewis and the News songs
1986 singles
1986 songs
Billboard Hot 100 number-one singles
Cashbox number-one singles
Chrysalis Records singles
RPM Top Singles number-one singles
Songs written by Chris Hayes (musician)
Songs written by Huey Lewis